B.B. "Sixty" Rayburn Correctional Center is a Louisiana Department of Public Safety and Corrections prison for men in unincorporated Washington Parish, Louisiana, near Angie.

History
The facility was originally named the Washington Correctional Institute (WCI). Construction began in 1982, and it began receiving prisoners in 1983. On August 31, 2006, it was renamed after B.B. "Sixty" Rayburn, a Louisiana state senator.

See also

References

External links
 B.B. Rayburn Correctional Center

Prisons in Louisiana
Buildings and structures in Washington Parish, Louisiana
1982 establishments in Louisiana